Leicht is a surname. Notable people with the surname include:

 Don Leicht (born 1946), American artist
 Helmut Leicht (1916–1944), German officer in the Luftwaffe
 Jacob Leicht (Wisconsin politician) (1876–1941), American politician
 Jake Leicht (1919–1992), American football player
 Stephen Leicht (born 1987), American stock car driver
 Stina Leicht, American author

See also
Leichter (surname)
Leight (surname)
Licht (surname)
Light (disambiguation)
Light (surname)
Lite (disambiguation)
Todd Lyght
Lyte (disambiguation)
Lyte (surname)